V. Subramanian is an Indian politician and former Member of the Legislative Assembly of Tamil Nadu. He was elected to the Tamil Nadu legislative assembly from Kandamangalam constituency as a Dravida Munnetra Kazhagam candidate in 1984, 1991, and 2001 elections.

References 

Dravida Munnetra Kazhagam politicians
Living people
Year of birth missing (living people)
Tamil Nadu MLAs 1985–1989
Tamil Nadu MLAs 1991–1996